Enes Uğurlu (born March 9, 1989) is an archer from Turkey.

References

1989 births
Living people
Turkish male archers